This page lists nationwide public opinion polls that were conducted relating to the 2012 United States presidential election between Democratic Incumbent President Barack Obama, Republican Mitt Romney, as well as other third-party and independent challengers.

The persons named in the polls were official candidates in the general election or former candidates for a particular party's nomination.

General election of 2012

Since convention nominations

Two-way race

*RV means "registered voters"; LV means "likely voters"; A means "adults". Polls with a (D), (R), or (L) indicate that they were sponsored by partisan groups affiliated with a party.

Three-way race

*RV means "registered voters"; LV means "likely voters"

Four-way race

*RV means "registered voters"; LV means "likely voters"

Five-way race

*RV means "registered voters"; LV means "likely voters"

Before Convention Nominations

Both convention nominations were completed by September 6, 2012.

Two-way race
*RV means "registered voters"; LV means "likely voters"; A means "adults". Polls with a (D), (R), or (L) indicate that they were sponsored by partisan groups affiliated with a party.

Two-way race with Gary Johnson

Three-way race with Gary Johnson

Hypothetical three-way race

Five-way race

Democratic primary
President Barack Obama ran uncontested in most states for the 2012 Democratic presidential nomination.

Hypothetical polling

Republican primary
See Nationwide opinion polling for the Republican Party 2012 presidential primaries

See also
Statewide opinion polling for the United States presidential election, 2012
Nationwide opinion polling for the Republican Party 2012 presidential primaries
Statewide opinion polling for the Republican Party presidential primaries, 2012
Nationwide opinion polling for the United States presidential election, 2008
Historical polling for U.S. Presidential elections

Notes

External links
 FiveThirtyEight at The New York Times
 Polling Report
 USA Election Polls

Opinion polling for the 2012 United States presidential election